Sławik, Slawik, Slawick are Polish-origin surnames:
 Henryk Sławik (1894–1944), a Polish politician, diplomat, and social worker
 Mateusz Sławik (born 1980, in Katowice), a Polish professional football goalkeeper

Slawik 
 Alexander Slawik (1900, České Budějovice – 1997, Vienna), Bohemian-Austrian Japanologist
  (born 1913, Vienna), Austrian SS-Oberscharführer
 , German astronomer and photographer
  (1936, Berndorf, Lower Austria – 1993), Austrian politician
  (born 1892, Krzanowice), Silesian-German Nazi-politician
 Nora Bayly Slawik (born 1962), a Minnesota politician

Slawick 
 Marcel Slawick, a French football referee

See also 

 

 Slavík, Slavik
 Slavíček
 Słowik (disambiguation)

Polish-language surnames